Rodbaston is a village in Staffordshire, England. The population as taken at the 2011 census can be found under Penkridge.  It is the location of a campus of South Staffordshire College.

References

Borough of Stafford
Villages in Staffordshire